Haig Yazdjian is a Syrian-Greek composer, vocalist, Oud player, and producer. He was born in Aleppo, Syria in 1959. His parents are Armenians from Kayseri and Nevşehir in modern-day Turkey. For much of his life he has lived in Greece, which is where he began his interest in traditional Eastern music. His first album Nihavend Ionga was not that famous. But the second one TALAR, showed up in 1996 and accelerated his popularity.

Yazdjian played on Loreena McKennitt's 2006 album An Ancient Muse.

Discography
 1995: Nihavend Ionga. Label: FM Records
 1996: Talar. Libra Music
 1998: Garin. Libra Music
 2001: Beast on the Moon. Label: Haig
 2001: Yeraz The Master Oud Player. Label: WMI
 2007: Amalur. Label: Libra Music
 2009: Rhythm In Topkapı Palace Orient Percussion - Arras. Label: Jet Plak Kaset
 2010: Imerologio. Warner
 2011: Stou Tragoudiou Tin Ohthi No 6. Warner

References

1959 births
Living people
Oud players
Ethnic Armenian musicians
Syrian people of Armenian descent
Syrian composers